Stylidium scandens (the climbing triggerplant) is a dicotyledonous plant that belongs to the genus Stylidium (family Stylidiaceae). S. scandens is endemic to Australia and is found primarily in the southwestern region of Western Australia. This species, along with Stylidium nymphaeum, has a unique characteristic among triggerplants in that its leaves, five centimetres (two inches) long, end in a recurved barb that can grab hold of other vegetation and scramble or climb up to 30–60 cm in height over other plants, which is how it obtained its common name. Its flowers are bright pink and about 15 mm wide.

See also 
 List of Stylidium species

References 

Carnivorous plants of Australia
Eudicots of Western Australia
scandens
Asterales of Australia
Plants described in 1831